Pon Pon Chapel was built in 1820 in Jacksonboro, South Carolina.  It was located "on Parker’s Ferry Road, the busy stagecoach thoroughfare that connected Charleston, South Carolina and Savannah, Georgia." Today, Parker's Ferry Road is a barely paved road along the south side of a power line right of way, and the ruins of the chapel can be found along this road east of Jacksonboro Road (State Road S-15-40).

It was listed on the National Register of Historic Places in 1972.

References

Buildings and structures in Colleton County, South Carolina
Properties of religious function on the National Register of Historic Places in South Carolina
History of South Carolina
National Register of Historic Places in Colleton County, South Carolina
Religious buildings and structures completed in 1820